École secondaire Macdonald-Cartier, in Sudbury, Ontario, opened its doors in 1969. École secondaire Macdonald-Cartier was the second public high school French language in Ontario to offer free education to all young francophones.  The school is often referred to as Mack-Jack, even though the school wasn't named after Jacques Cartier. The school was named after two of the fathers of Canadian Confederation, John A. Macdonald (1815-1891) and George-Étienne Cartier (1814-1873).

Notable alumni 
Prominent alumni include:
 François Bach, award-winning product designer
 Chuck Labelle, singer-songwriter
 Daniel Bédard, musician, composer, arranger, record producer, and audio engineer

See also
List of high schools in Ontario

High schools in Greater Sudbury
French-language high schools in Ontario
Educational institutions established in 1969
1969 establishments in Ontario